Antonín Odehnal (1 October 1878 – 6 April 1957) was a Czechoslovak sculptor. His work was part of the sculpture event in the art competition at the 1932 Summer Olympics.

References

1878 births
1957 deaths
[
Olympic competitors in art competitions
People from Žďár nad Sázavou District
Czechoslovak sculptors